The discography of English musician Rex Orange County consists of four studio albums, twenty singles (including two as a featured artist) and four music videos.

Studio albums

Singles

As lead artist

As featured artist

Other charted songs

Music videos
"Sunflower" (2017) (produced by Illegal Civ Cinema)
"Loving Is Easy" (2017) (directed by Chris Ullens)
"10/10" (2019) (directed by Warren Fu)
"One in a Million" (2022)

Notes

References

Discographies of British artists
Pop music discographies